The Man with the Horn is an album released by Miles Davis in 1981. This was Davis's first new studio album since 1972’s On the Corner, his first recordings of any kind since 1975 and his first activity following a six-year retirement. The album title references his 1952 10-inch LP Young Man with a Horn.

Largely pop influenced, the album fuses 1980s rock, pop and R & B with improvisational funk and fusion styles. The album marked Davis's return to more traditional acoustic trumpet playing after having utilized electronics in the mid-1970s, although the title song "The Man with the Horn" does feature a wah-wah pedal on Davis's improvisation (along with a lead vocal by keyboardist Randy Hall).

Track listing
All tracks composed by Miles Davis; except where indicated

 "Fat Time" – 9:53
 "Back Seat Betty" – 11:15
 "Shout" (Glenn Burris, Randy Hall, Robert Irving III) – 5:52
 "Aïda" – 8:10
 "The Man with the Horn" (Hall, Irving) – 6:32
 "Ursula" – 10:50

Personnel 
 Miles Davis – trumpet, arrangements (1, 2, 4, 6), Wah pedal (5)
 Bill Evans – soprano saxophone (1, 2, 4, 5, 6)
 Robert Irving III – Yamaha CS30 synthesizer (3, 5), acoustic piano (5), arrangements
 Randy Hall – Minimoog (3, 5), arrangements (3, 5), celeste (5), electric guitar (5), lead and backing vocals (5)
 Mike Stern – electric guitar (1)
 Barry Finnerty – electric guitar (2, 3, 4, 6)
 Marcus Miller – electric bass (1, 2, 4, 6)
 Felton Crews – electric bass (3, 5)
 Al Foster – drums (1, 2, 4, 6)
 Vince Wilburn, Jr. – drums (3, 5)
 Sammy Figueroa – percussion (1-4, 6)

Production
 George Butler – executive producer 
 Teo Macero – producer 
 Don Puluse – engineer (1), remix engineer 
 Stan Tonkel – engineer (2-6)
 Harold Tarowsky – technical adviser
 Ted Brosnan – second engineer 
 Nancy Byers – second engineer 
 Joe Gastwirt – mastering 
 Recorded, mixed and mastered  at CBS Recording Studios (New York, NY)
 John Berg – design 
 Cindy Brown – design
 Bob Cato – photography

References

Miles Davis albums
1981 albums
Albums produced by Teo Macero
Columbia Records albums